Millettia warneckei is a species of plant in the family Fabaceae. It is found in Ghana, Guinea, Liberia, Sierra Leone, and Togo. It is threatened by habitat loss.

References

warneckei
Flora of West Tropical Africa
Vulnerable plants
Taxonomy articles created by Polbot